Bateshwar Halt railway station is a small railway station in Agra district, Uttar Pradesh. Its code is BASR. It serves Bateshwar town. The station consists of one platform. The platform is not well sheltered. It lacks many facilities including water and sanitation.

Trains 

 Bandra Terminus–Ghazipur City Weekly Express 
 Agra Cantt.–Mainpuri DEMU (via Etawah)
 Bateshwar railway station
 Mainpuri–Agra Cantt. DEMU

References

Railway stations in Agra district
Agra railway division